SWAYAM is an Indian government Massive open online course (MOOC) platform providing educational opportunities for a vast number of university and college learners.

SWAYAM (meaning 'Self' in Sanskrit) is an acronym that stands for "Study Webs of Active-Learning for Young Aspiring Minds". Courses delivered through SWAYAM are available free of cost to the learners. However learners wishing to obtain a SWAYAM certificate should register for the final proctored exams that come at a fee and attend in-person at designated centres on specified dates.

History 

The SWAYAM initiative was launched by the then Ministry of Human Resource Development (M.H.R.D.) (now Ministry of Education), Government of India under Digital India to give a coordinated stage and free entry to web courses, covering all advanced education, High School and skill sector courses. It was launched on 9th July 2017 by Ram Nath Kovind, Honorable President of India. SWAYAM has been developed cooperatively by MHRD (Ministry of Human Resource Development), and AICTE (All India Council for Technical Education) with the help of Microsoft. The current SWAYAM platform is equipped for facilitating 2,000 courses. The platform offers free access to everyone and hosts courses from class 9 to post-graduation. It enables professors and faculty of centrally funded institutes like IITs, IIMs, IISERs, etc. to teach students.

According to SWAYAM there are 203 partnering institutes, 2,748 completed courses, 12,541,992 student enrollments, 915,538 exam registrations, and 654,664 successful certificates.

Functionality 
SWAYAM operates MOOCs learning resources in different ways and structure. Learning is delivered in four ways; e-Tutorial, e-Content, discussion forums and self- assessment.

The first quadrant is direct teaching, which means that there is no much extra work by students. It could include teaching video, animation, PowerPoint presentation, Podcast and so on. These will depend on the individual subject and the strategy adopted by the teacher.

The second quadrant is an e-content which could include e-books, illustrations, Case studies, Open source content, reference links, further reading sources, etc.

The third quadrant is about clearing students' queries where students can interact with each other and faculty; any student or faculty can answer a student’s question.

The fourth quadrant is self-assessment to check what a student has studied and whether they are eligible to get a certificate. This includes tests in the form of Multiple Choice Questions (MCQs), quiz or short answer questions, long answer questions, etc. The fourth quadrant also has Frequently Asked Questions (FAQs) and their answers to clarify common misconceptions among students.

The University Grants Commission (UGC) considers that universities should play a key role in publicising and popularising SWAYAM courses among their learners and the university, enabling them to gain from MOOCs on a more extensive footing.

National coordinators 
Nine national coordinators are appointed to manage the course content. Each coordinator is assigned a particular area for maintenance.
 All India Council for Technical Education (AICTE) has been appointed as a National coordinator by MHRD for self-paced and international courses. 
 National Programme on Technology Enhanced Learning (NPTEL) has been as a appointed National coordinator by MHRD for engineering sector courses.
 University Grants Commission (UGC) has been appointed as a National coordinator by MHRD for non-technical post-graduate education.
 Consortium for Educational Communication (CEC) has been appointed as a National coordinator by MHRD for undergraduate education.
 National Council of Educational Research and Training (NCERT) has been appointed as a National coordinator by MHRD for school education.
 National Institute of Open Schooling (NIOS) has been appointed as a National coordinator by MHRD for school education.
 Indira Gandhi National Open University (IGNOU) has been appointed as a National coordinator by MHRD for out-of-school students.
 Indian Institute of Management, Bangalore (IIMB) has been appointed as a National coordinator by MHRD for management studies.
 National Institute of Technical Teachers Training and Research (NITTTR) has been appointed as a National coordinator by MHRD for Teacher training program.

Courses offered

Credit transfer 
All the courses offered by SWAYAM are recognized by the government of India. All the courses are valid in the country. UGC announced a “Credit Framework for Online Learning Courses through SWAYAM” Regulations where credit transfer was defined. The UGC regulation requires Universities to make changes in their rules to incorporate provisions for credit mobility and MOOC courses under the SWAYAM platform. Certificates will be given upon completing the criteria of the course taken, and that certificate can be used for credit mobility for academic credits. The current guideline of UGC constrains just 20% of the courses for a degree-level program.

Local chapter 
NPTEL is a joint initiative of the IITs and IISC. NPTEL offers online courses and certifications in various fields and has set up a system to provide certificate courses in different colleges across India termed as NPTEL- local chapters. A local chapter will be under one faculty member of the college as one Single Point of Contact (SPOC).

Further under the SWAYAM-NPTEL webpage, two more departments are operated, i.e., timeline, list of active local chapters, local chapter ratings, etc. Other departments show news from local chapters, i.e., local chapter colleges/universities. Each Local Chapter has a separate Coordinator/SPOC.

SWAYAM PRABHA 
SWAYAM PRABHA is an education learning platform initiated by the Ministry of Human Resource Development (MHRD) available through 34 (initially 32) DTH channels. This initiative provides an educational program on television in multiple time zones. The content providers are NPTEL, IITs, UGC, NCERT, etc. (as with the SWAYAM online portal. The content providers are NPTEL, IITs, UGC, NCERT, etc (as with the SWAYAM online portal).

References  

Educational organisations based in India
Ministry of Education (India)
Kumar, K., Mahendraprabu, M. Open educational practices of SWAYAM programme among research scholars. Educ Inf Technol (2021). https://doi.org/10.1007/s10639-021-10495-2